A speaker enclosure using a passive radiator (PR) usually contains an "active  loudspeaker" (or main driver), and a passive radiator (also known as a "drone cone"). The active loudspeaker is a normal driver, and the passive radiator is of similar construction, but without a voice coil and magnet assembly. It is not attached to a voice coil or wired to an electrical circuit or power amplifier. Small and Hurlburt have published the results of research into the analysis and design of passive-radiator loudspeaker systems. The passive-radiator principle was identified as being particularly useful in compact systems where vent realization is difficult or impossible, but it can also be applied satisfactorily to larger systems.

In the same way as a ported loudspeaker, a passive radiator system uses the sound pressure otherwise trapped in the enclosure to excite a resonance that makes it easier for the speaker system to create the deepest pitches (e.g., basslines). The passive radiator resonates at a frequency determined by its mass and the springiness (compliance) of the air in the enclosure. It is tuned to the specific enclosure by varying its mass (e.g., by adding weight to the cone). Internal air pressure produced by movements of the active driver cone moves the passive radiator cone. This resonance simultaneously reduces the amount that the woofer has to move.

Design considerations
Passive radiators are used instead of a reflex port for several reasons. In small-volume enclosures tuned to low frequencies, the length of the required port becomes very large. They are also used to reduce or eliminate the objectionable noises of port turbulence and compressive flow caused by high-velocity airflow in small ports. In addition, ports have pipe resonances that can produce undesirable effects on the frequency response. To a first-order approximation, the passive radiator works identically to a port.

Passive radiators are tuned by mass variations (Mmp), changing the way that they interact with the compliance of the air in the box. The weight of the cone of the passive radiator should be approximately equivalent to the mass of the air that would have filled the port which might have been used for that design. If the passive radiator's acoustic mass equals that of the port, and the PR's compliance is negligible, then the frequency response behaviour of these two types of systems will be virtually identical.

Although the frequency response of a passive radiator will be similar to that of a ported cabinet, the system low-frequency roll-off will be slightly steeper (5th-order rather than 4th-order), due to a notch (dip) in the frequency response caused by the Vap (compliance or stiffness) of the passive radiator. This notch occurs at the PR's free-air resonant frequency and causes slightly poorer transient response. Despite this, perhaps due to the lack of vent turbulence and vent pipe resonances, some listeners prefer the sound of PRs to reflex ports. PR speakers are only slightly more complex to design and are generally more expensive as compared to standard bass reflex enclosures.

Applications
Passive radiators are used in Bluetooth speakers, home stereo speakers, subwoofer cabinets and car audio speaker systems, particularly in cases where there is not enough space for a port or vent system. While most studio monitor speakers are either ported bass reflex designs, or closed-back without a vent or passive radiator, Mackie's HR824 and HR624 monitor speakers have a passive radiator installed on the rear of the cabinet. Focal also sells a studio monitor with a passive radiator called the SM9.
Respective examples of a smart speaker and a portable Bluetooth Speaker utilizing passive radiators are Apple's HomePod mini and Ultimate Ears' UE Boom.

See also
 Loudspeaker enclosure
 Bass reflex - a type of loudspeaker enclosure that uses a port (hole) or vent cut into the cabinet and a section of tubing or pipe affixed to the port
 Acoustic suspension - a method of loudspeaker cabinet design and utilisation that uses one or more loudspeaker drivers mounted in a sealed box or cabinet

References

Loudspeaker technology
Audio engineering